Mount Binaiya (Indonesian: Gunung Binaia) is the highest point on the Indonesian island of Seram (or Ceram) and the highest mountain in the province of Maluku.

Mount Binaiya or Binaya located at Manusela National Park with endemic biodiversity like cassowary, cuscus, Seram friarbird, Moluccan king parrot, Ternate parrot (Lorius garrulus), purple-naped parrot/blackhead parrot (Lorius domicella), Ceram Cockatoo (Cacatua moluccensis), kingfisher (Todiramphus lazuli and Todiramphus sanctus), big Seram honeybird (Philemon subcorniculatus), and Ceram bat (Pteropus ocularis).

See also
 List of Ultras of Malay Archipelago

References

Binaiya
Geography of Seram Island
Central Maluku Regency